Yuan Qigui (袁齊媯) (405 – 8 September 440), formally Empress Yuan (元皇后, literally "the discerning empress") was an empress of the Chinese Liu Song dynasty. Her husband was Emperor Wen (Liu Yilong).

Yuan Qigui was a daughter of the official Yuan Dan (袁湛) and his concubine, Lady Wang, but her mother was of such low status that Yuan Dan did not let others know of Yuan Qigui's existence until she was four or five. She married Liu Yilong when he was still the Prince of Yidu, and she bore him his oldest son Liu Shao and a daughter, Liu Ying'e (劉英娥), later the Princess Dongyang. After key imperial officials concluded that his brother Emperor Shao was unfit to be emperor, they deposed and killed Emperor Shao in 424 and offered the throne to Liu Yilong. Liu Yilong accepted and took the throne as Emperor Wen. Later that year, on 26 October, he created her empress.

It was around this time, either right before or right after Emperor Wen became emperor, that Empress Yuan bore him Liu Shao. According to traditional histories, when she observed her son's face, she remarked that this child would bring disaster on the house and was ready to kill her child.  Emperor Wen, hearing this, rushed to her bedchambers and forced her to spare the child.  (Some later historians, including Bo Yang, doubted this account.) However, because he was still within the three-year mourning period for his father Emperor Wu and supposed to abstain from sexual relations, he hid Liu Shao's birth from the public and only announced it in 426.

Emperor Wen initially favored Empress Yuan greatly. Because the Yuan clan was a poor one, she often requested him to give her money so that she could give them to her clan. Emperor Wen, who was known to be thrifty, refused to give her much. Later on, he began to favor Consort Pan more than her. In order to test Emperor Wen's affection for her, Empress Yuan asked Consort Pan to request an amount of money six to 10 times greater than what Emperor Wen had been giving her.  Emperor Wen approved Consort Pan's request; from this point on, Empress Yuan was filled with anger. Whenever Emperor Wen wished to see her, she would try to hide from him, and she also refused to see her stepchildren. She grew ill in her anger, and in 440 she grew very ill. Emperor Wen went to her chambers to see her and, crying, held her hands to ask what request she had. She looked at him for a long time and then, without saying anything, covered her face with a blanket and refused to look at him again. She soon died.  Emperor Wen mourned her greatly and had the talented writer Yan Yanzhi (顏延之) write a beautiful ode dedicated to her.

References

Liu Song empresses
405 births
440 deaths